Fred Haslam is a software engineer and mobile platform developer who has worked for eBay, Inc. since January 2011.  While working at Maxis from mid 1989 through 1994, he was the lead developer on SimEarth and SimCity 2000, co-authoring them with Will Wright.  He also created an online game called Dragon Court.

Haslam and his family moved to Vancouver, Washington, in 2004.  In 2006 he received a BS in computer science from Washington State University Vancouver.  He is the son of writer Gerald Haslam.

References

American video game designers
Living people
Maxis
People from Vancouver, Washington
Year of birth missing (living people)